Pete Cabrinha (born September 13, 1961 on Oahu, Hawaii) is an American big-wave surfer, windsurfer, kitesurfer and artist. He is the founder and brand manager of Cabrinha Kites.

Career

Windsurfing 
In 1985 he won the world wave sailing championship.

Tow-Surfing 
In 1993, Cabrinha and his friends Laird Hamilton, Dave Kalama, Rush Randle, Brett Lickle, Mike Waltze, Mark Angulo, Derrick Doerner, and Buzzy Kerbox started to experiment in big surf on the North Shore of Maui and invented a spin off called tow-surfing. They called themselves the "Strapped Crew”. Using a personal watercraft to tow themselves into large waves they set out to explore the outer limits of big wave surfing.

Kitesurfing 
In the late 90s, Cabrinha experimented with kites and helped pioneer the sport of Kiteboarding. Together with his friend Dan Bolfing, Cabrinha began to design kiteboards under the Cabrinha label. In 2000 Cabrinha joined forces with the Pryde Group and Cabrinha Kites was born. The company launched their first product line in 2000 and is now selling kiteboarding equipment in over 70 countries.

Foilboarding and wingsurfing 
Foilboarding and wingsurfing are other hybrid surf sports which Cabrinha helped to pioneer and later industrialize.

Artist life 
A son to an artist mother, Cabrinha pursued the arts for over three decades. His mixed media art works combine his photography and graphic design skills with off-center painting techniques.

Personal life 
Cabrinha lives on Maui with his wife, former windsurfer and fashion designer Lisa Letarte Cabrinha, and his daughter, Tahiti Cabrinha.

Titles 
1985 WSMA World Champion (Wave Performance) 
2004 Billabong XXL Award, World Record: Largest wave ever ridden

Media Appearances

Movies and Documentaries 
The Longest Wave, 2019
The Excellent Life, 2019
Take every wave: The Life of Laird Hamilton, 2017
Strapped: The Origins of Tow-In Surfing, 2002
Wake up Call, 1996
Upwind 
Tradewind: The Wavesailing Film, 1984
Zalman King film In God’s Hands, 1998

Other Media Appearances 
Kiteboarding Magazine, The Link between Surfing and Art, October 2019.

Chapter One: The Kiteboard Legacy Begins, Audiobook, 2018.

Looking Sideways Podcast, 2018.

Adventure Sports Network, The Evolution of Pete Cabrinha: 4 Decades at the Cutting Edge of Watersports, 2018.

Liquid Salt Mag, Interview, 2018.

Time Magazine: Top 100 Innovators, September 2001.

References

American surfers
American windsurfers
American kitesurfers
Living people
Male kitesurfers
1961 births